Herbert Hall Winslow (November 23, 1865 – June 1, 1930) was an American stage actor and playwright. He acted in and directed in the 1914 silent film Manon Lescaut.

Winslow was born in Keokuk, Iowa.

More than 100 plays that Winslow wrote were produced, most of which were performed by stock theater companies and touring troupes. His works that were produced on Broadway included He Loved the Ladies (1927), Mercenary Mary (1925), What's Your Wife Doing? (1923), Broken Branches (1922), Just Around the Corner (1919), The Girl From Broadway (1907), The Spellbinder (1904), The Vinegar Buyer (1903), and The Great Northwest (1896).

In 1893, Winslow sought a divorce from his wife, Daisey, but the Yankton, South Dakota, jury's decision went in his wife's favor, and the couple remained married.

On June 1, 1930, Winslow died at Hastings-on-Hudson, New York at age 64.

Selected filmography
 Manon Lescaut (1914)
 The Great Diamond Robbery (1914)
 The Siren's Song (1915)
 Sunday (1915)
 The Millionaire Pirate (1919)
 Reckless Romance (1924)

References

Bibliography
 Paul Fryer, Olga Usova. Lina Cavalieri: The Life of Opera's Greatest Beauty, 1874-1944. McFarland, 2003.

External links

1865 births
1930 deaths
American dramatists and playwrights
20th-century American screenwriters